Matthewman is a surname. Notable people with the surname include:

Gwen Matthewman (1927–2014)
Keith Matthewman (1936–2008), English judge
Phyllis Matthewman (1896–1979), English writer
Stuart Matthewman (born 1960), English musician
Thomas Matthewman (1903–1990), British sprinter